Kesja is an Old Norse word that may refer to:

 a Viking weapon, probably a kind of polearm, used by Scandinavians during the Viking age
 Harald Kesja, a son of Eric I of Denmark